Edward Smith (1 June 1831 – 16 June 1899) was an English cricketer. Smith's batting style is unknown. He was born in London.

Smith made his first-class debut for Surrey against Cambridgeshire in 1858 at The Oval. He made a second first-class appearance for the Surrey Club against the Marylebone Cricket Club at Lord's in 1859. He scored a total of 20 runs in his two matches, with a high score of 9 not out.

He died at Pewsey, Wiltshire on 16 June 1899.

References

External links
Edward Smith at ESPNcricinfo
Edward Smith at CricketArchive

1831 births
1899 deaths
Cricketers from Greater London
English cricketers
Surrey cricketers
Surrey Club cricketers